The Rose Valley financial scandal or simply Rose Valley Chit Fund Scam was a major financial scam and alleged political scandal in India caused by the collapse of a Ponzi scheme run by Rose Valley Group.

Rose Valley scam is one of the biggest financial frauds, which rocked the state of West Bengal in 2013. As per Enforcement Directorate (ED) estimates, Rs 17,520 crore was reportedly raised from investors across India. The all India small depositors association pegged the amount at Rs 40,000 crore. Few reports pegged the amount at over Rs 60,000 crore.

The states affected by the scam were West Bengal, Assam, Bihar and Tripura. 

The Rose Valley group had allegedly floated a total of 27 companies for running the alleged chit fund operations of which only half a dozen were active. It is alleged that the company had made "cross investments" in its various sister firms to suppress its liabilities towards investors.

According to ED, a portion of the money was also used to bribe politicians so that the scam could run smoothly. The ED had frozen 2,500 accounts of the Rose Valley group and the agency suspects that there are many more to be tracked and frozen.

In 2015, Rose Valley chairman Gautam Kundu was arrested in money laundering case and probed by the CBI and Enforcement Directorate. In the course of the investigation, the government froze all the 2,600 bank accounts of the Rose Valley Group, which held around Rs 800 to 1,000 crore.

The name of AITC MP, Actor  Tapas Paul too had surfaced during investigations as he was the director in the company.

On January 25, 2019, CBI arrested Bengali film producer Srikant Mohta for duping Rose Valley Group by Rs 25 crore. Mohta's company Shree Venkatesh Films has produced many award-winning films like Chokher Bali, Memories In March, Autograph, Raincoat and Iti Mrinalini.

References

External links

21st-century scandals
Pyramid and Ponzi schemes
Corporate scandals
Financial scandals
Scandals in India
2016 scandals
2014 scandals
Crime in West Bengal
Crime in Odisha
Crime in Assam